Jan Hus is a 2015 Czech historical television film directed by Jiří Svoboda. It is based on the life of Jan Hus. It consists of three parts. Jan Hus is one of the most expensive projects of Czech Television.

Cast
Matěj Hádek as Jan Hus
Milan Kňažko as Dominikán
Jan Dolanský as Štěpán Paleč
Vladimír Javorský as Wenceslaus IV of Bohemia
Michal Dlouhý as Sigismund of Luxemburg
Jan Plouhar as Jeroným Pražský
Marika Šoposká as Sophia of Bavaria

Plot
The film starts when Czech king Wenceslaus IV is imprisoned by his brother Sigismund. Sigismund's troops pillage Bohemian territory. Jan Hus criticises the new order during his sermons. He also starts to criticise conditions in the Church which earns him hatred from other priests. Pope imposes Prague to an Interdict and Hus has to leave Prague. He is not safe in his hometown Husinec but Jidnřich  offers him hideout. Hus is invited to Kostnice to defend his teachings. He agrees but is arrested on his way. He is executed on 6 June 1415.

Shooting
Shooting started in June 2014. It took place on 20 locations in the Czech Republic using approximately 2,000 extras. Shooting finished on 24 February 2015.

Reception
The film received mixed reviews.

Historian Martin Vaňáč  criticised the film for numerous historical inaccuracies.

References

External links
 
 Official website

2015 television films
2015 films
2010s Czech-language films
Czech historical films
Films set in the 15th century
Biographical films about religious leaders
Cultural depictions of Jan Hus
Czech television films
Czech Television original films
2010s historical films
Films released in separate parts